This list of accidents and incidents involving airliners by airline summarizes airline accidents and all kinds of minor incidents by airline company with flight number, location, date, aircraft type, and cause.

This list is dynamic and by no means complete!

While all of the incidents in this list are noteworthy, not all the incidents listed involved fatalities.

.

0-9

A

B

C

See also
 Lists of disasters

References

External links
 Aircraft Crashes Record Office
 AirSafe
 Aviation Safety Network
 Federal Aviation Administration: Accident & Incident Data

Aviation accidents
Accidents and incidents